Pavel Kruk (born 3 February 1992) is a Belarusian former professional football player.

External links

1992 births
Living people
Belarusian footballers
Association football defenders
Belarusian expatriate footballers
Expatriate footballers in Lithuania
Expatriate footballers in Latvia
Belarusian expatriate sportspeople in Lithuania
A Lyga players
FC Dinamo Minsk players
FC Bereza-2010 players
FK Riteriai players
FC Belshina Bobruisk players
FC UAS Zhitkovichi players
FK Panevėžys players
Belarus youth international footballers
Belarus under-21 international footballers